Abbottina lalinensis is a species of ray-finned fish in the genus Abbottina.

References 

 

Abbottina
Fish described in 1995